Marley Sianto Sikawa (born c. 1990) is a Kenyan communications and marketing professional, who served as the tourism marketing coordinator and currently the Assistant Director, Tourism and Wildlife Narok County, one of the 47 administrative Kenyan counties.

Early life and education
Her family moved frequently and she grew up in Narok, Maasai Mara, Sekenani and Loita.

After attending Siana Boarding Primary School locally in Maasai Mara, she attended Moi Siongiroi Girls' Secondary School in Bomet County. She was then admitted to Daystar University, in Nairobi, where she graduated with a Bachelor of Arts in Communication, Electronic Media & Public Relations degree. She then enrolled in the United States International University Africa, also in Nairobi, where she pursued a Master of Arts in International Relations.

Career
As of November 2014, Sikawa was employed by the government of Narok County, as the tourism marketing coordinator, currently the Assistant Director Tourism and Wildlife. She is also active in her community, where she has helped the local women access solar electricity through Naretoi Ang’, a non profit organisation that operates the ‘Solar for Manyatta’ projects in the community on matters of conservation of wildlife with the community, cultural preservation by documentation and education for the community in health and school sponsorship linkage. She is a board member of the Sacred Nature Initiative (SNI) by Jonathan and Angela Scott, She is also a social media influencer on matters travel, culture and sports, she is the social media team for the Aligned Alliance team by Rhonda Vetere, the strategic manager For Uzani Weightlifting founded by the Kenyan Olympic weightlifter Webstar Lukose.

Family
Ms Sikawa is a mother to one daughter.

Other considerations
In September 2018, Business Daily Africa, a Kenyan, English language, daily newspaper, named Sianto Sikawa, among the "Top 40 Under 40 Women in Kenya in 2018". In the past, Sianto won the Miss Narok Beauty Pageant.

In 2015, at the age of 24 years she was crowned Miss Tourism Narok County and Miss Tourism Kenya. She also walked the catwalk at the 2015 New York Fashion Week, modeling Spring/Summer 2015 collections by Tamil International fashion house.

References

External links
 
 Website Narok County Government
 The Solar Entrepreneurs Emerging From Rural Kenya’s Cellphone Revolution

Living people
1990s births
Kenyan philanthropists
People from Narok County
Maasai people
Daystar University alumni
United States International University alumni
Kenyan female models